
Year 327 (CCCXXVII) was a common year starting on Sunday (link will display the full calendar) of the Julian calendar. At the time, it was known as the Year of the Consulship of Constantius and Maximus (or, less frequently, year 1080 Ab urbe condita). The denomination 327 for this year has been used since the early medieval period, when the Anno Domini calendar era became the prevalent method in Europe for naming years.

Events 
 By place 
 Roman Empire 
 Emperor Constantine the Great decrees that rural slaves can only be sold in the province where they reside, in order to resolve the shortage of labour in the Roman Empire.

 By topic 
 Religion 
 Construction begins on the cathedral of Antioch (Syria).
 Approximate traditional date – Helena, mother of Constantine, returning from her pilgrimage to the Holy Land, founds Stavrovouni Monastery on Cyprus.

Births 
 Urban of Langres, French bishop and saint
 Zhang Chonghua, Chinese ruler of Han Zhao (d. 353)

Deaths

 June 3 – Awtel, Eastern Christian monk and saint
 Cleopatra, Christian martyr and saint (or 319)
 Jonas and Barachisius, Persian martyrs
 Melitius of Lycopolis, Christian bishop

References